The Ceutan Democratic Union (Spanish: Unión Demócrata Ceutí, abbreviated to UDCE) is a left-wing political party in Ceuta, a Spanish exclave on the North African coast, bordering Morocco. It was registered on 4 September 2002.

In 2009, it merged with the Socialist Party of the People of Ceuta to make the Caballas Coalition.

Sources

References

Political parties in Ceuta
Political parties established in 2002
2002 establishments in Spain
Political parties disestablished in 2009
2009 disestablishments in Spain
Democratic socialist parties in Europe
Socialist parties in Spain
Berbers in Spain